Hopatcong State Park is a state park in the Landing section of Roxbury Township, New Jersey. Operated and maintained by the New Jersey Division of Parks and Forestry, the park consists of two parcels of land: one that encompasses Lake Hopatcong and some of its southwestern shore, and another that encompasses Lake Musconetcong about one mile to the west-southwest.

The park contains remnants of Morris Canal, which operated from the 1830s to the 1920s and was largely fed by the lake. The park is also home to the Lake Hopatcong Historical Museum, housed in the former home of the lock tender and his family.

Activities
Swimming is permitted in the park from Memorial Day through Labor Day while lifeguards are on duty.

Subject to NJDEP regulations, there is year-round fishing at Lake Hopatcong and Lake Musconetcong, which are stocked by New Jersey Division of Fish and Wildlife stocks them with brown trout, rainbow trout and brook trout.  Commonly caught warmwater species include large mouth bass, sunfish, catfish, perch and pickerel. During the winter, ice fishing is allowed in certain conditions.

Lake Hopatcong allows boating in canoes, large motor boats, sailboats, sailboards and jet skis. Boats are available for rent at many private marinas around the lake. Boating is subject to New Jersey Boating Regulations and Marine Law. There is a boat ramp in the park.

The park has two playgrounds, two half-basketball courts, sand volleyball, and a large playing field for field sports. There are several picnic areas in the park with grills and tables. Local children have been known to use the hill for winter sledding.

Museum
The museum has collections on the history of Lake Hopatcong, with emphasis on transportation and entertainment. The Brookland Forge, along with several mills on the Musconetcong River, were built nearby  when the river had been dammed to form Brookland Pond, now known as Lake Hopatcong.

Morris Canal

The park has a display of the technology used by the Morris Canal to power its inclined planes. The Scotch Turbine, a type of reaction turbine, from Inclined Plane 3 East, formerly at Ledgewood, was brought here in 1926 as the canal was being decommissioned.

See also

List of New Jersey state parks

References

External links

 
 Lake Hopatcong Historical Museum
 
 
 

State parks of New Jersey
Parks in Morris County, New Jersey
Parks in Sussex County, New Jersey
Roxbury Township, New Jersey